is a Cubist oil painting created by Jean Metzinger in 1913. The painting was exhibited in Paris at the 1913 Salon d'Automne.

The work was acquired by the National Gallery in 1936 (on deposit by the ), where it was placed on display in Room 5. It was later confiscated by the Nazis around 1936, displayed at the Degenerate Art Exhibition in Munich and other cities, 1937–38, and has been missing ever since.

Description
 is a large oil painting on canvas with approximate dimensions , representing an elegantly dressed woman painted in a Cubist style holding an umbrella while she sits in a canoe or small boat. Water with undulating waves or ripples and two other boats are visible in the background. The vertical composition is divided, fragmented or faceted into series of non-Euclidean spherical arcs, hyperbolic triangles, rectangles, squares, planes or surfaces delineated by contrasting form.

For example, the two boats in the 'background' are smaller than the boat in the 'foreground' within which the model is sitting, consistent with classical perspective in that objects appear smaller as distance from the observer increases. However, to be perfectly consistent one would expect the boat on the top left of the composition to be smaller still than the boat just left of the models head. There is no perspectival fusion between objects close and far, yet the notion of depth perception has not been abolished. Overall, the spatial attributes of the scene are disjointed and flattened to the point where no absolute frame of reference can be determined.

The chronophotography of Eadweard Muybridge and Étienne-Jules Marey had a profound influence on the beginnings of Cubism.

A predecessor to cinematography and moving film, chronophotography involved a series or succession of different images, originally created and used for the scientific study of movement. These studies would directly influence Marcel Duchamp's Nude Descending a Staircase, No. 2 and could also be read into Metzinger's work of 1910–1914, though rather than simultaneously superimposing successive images to depict the motion, Metzinger represents the subject at rest viewed from multiple angles; the dynamic role is played by the artist rather than the subject.

Yet, what is achieved is fundamentally anti-naturalistic.

Dimensions

However, Metzinger's painting is portrayed in a variety of black and white photographs shot between 1914 and 1930, and appears in a film recorded at the 1937 Degenerate Art Exhibition. Two of these images show the work hanging next to paintings of known dimensions. The earliest is a photograph taken in Prague, 1914, published in the magazine , where the painting is seen hanging next to Metzinger's  (Woman with a Fan), 1913, oil on canvas, Art Institute of Chicago.

Another image, taken at the Degenerate Art Exhibition in 1937, shows  next to Willi Baumeister, Handstand, 1923, oil on canvas, .

This corresponds to a standard stretcher format referred to as 80 Figure (80 F). Most, if not all, of Metzinger's works from the period, including his monumental , are painted on canvases corresponding to these traditional formats; proportioning his works to approximate the golden ratio, in the belief that this proportion is aesthetically pleasing. The golden section and other similar geometric configurations symbolized for Metzinger and his colleagues a belief in order and the significance of mathematical proportions, because it reflected patterns and relationships occurring in nature.

The golden proportion, upon which  may have been based, represented simultaneously a continuity with past traditions and current trends in related fields, while leaving open future developments in the arts.

History
The year 1913 saw the Cubist movement continuing to evolve, wrote Albert Gleizes:

The changes it had already undergone since the Indépendants of 1911 could leave people in no doubt as to its nature. Cubism was not a school, distinguished by some superficial variation on a generally accepted norm. It was a total regeneration, indicating the emergence of a wholly new cast of mind. Every season it appeared renewed, growing like a living body. Its enemies could, eventually, have forgiven it if only it had passed away, like a fashion; but they became even more violent when they realised that it was destined to live a life that would be longer than that of those painters who had been the first to assume the responsibility for it.

At the 1913 Salon des Indépendants could be seen a very large work of Jean Metzinger's - L'Oiseau Bleu; L'Equipe de Cardiff from Robert Delaunay; two important canvasses from Léger; still lifes and L'Homme au Café from Juan Gris; enthusiastic new work from La Fresnaye and from Marcoussis, and from others again; and finally, from myself, Les Joueurs de Football.

Again, to the Salon d'Automne of 1913 - a salon in which Cubism was now the predominating tendency - Metzinger sent the great picture called En Bâteau, La Fresnaye La Conquête de l'Air, myself Les Bâteaux de Pêche and La Ville et le Fleuve. If the first moment of surprise had passed by, the interest Cubism excited was as great as ever. The anger and the enthusiasm had not changed sides, our enemies held to their guns. It is enough for proof to read the diatribes of Louis Vauxcelles in Gil Blas for that year, 1913, and the panegyrics of Guillaume Apollinaire in L'Intransigeant.Guillaume Apollinaire, Le Vernissage du Salon d’Automne, L'Intransigeant, Paris, 15 November 1913, Gallica, Bibliothèque nationale de France

En Canot was acquired at the Galerie Der Sturm in 1916 by the artist Georg Muche, whose father was a naïve painter and art collector known as Felix Muche-Ramholz. The Galerie Der Sturm founded in 1912 by Herwarth Walden in Berlin became the core of Berlin's modern art scene, lasting a decade. Starting with an exhibition of Fauves and Der Blaue Reiter, followed by the introduction in Germany of Cubism and Italian Futurism.

En Canot was exhibited in 1930 at the Kronprinzenpalais, National Gallery, Berlin, along with works by Willi Baumeister, Oskar Schlemmer, Rudolf Belling and others (works later found in Entartete Kunst).

It was subsequently confiscated by the German Reich Ministry of Public Enlightenment and Propaganda (Reichsministerium für Volksaufklärung und Propaganda, RMVP or Propagandaministerium) in 1936 or 1937 and displayed at the Degenerate Art exhibition (Entartete Kunst) in Munich. The exhibition traveled to several other cities in Germany and Austria. The show, mounted by the Nazis, consisted of modern art chaotically hung and accompanied by text labels deriding the art. Paintings were hung crowded together, some with no frames, alongside racist slogans denigrating the artists for "insulting German womanhood" and revealing "sick minds." It was designed to inflame public opinion against Modernism. The painting was apparently moved to Güstrow by the Rote Armee (Red Army) and has been missing ever since.

Metzinger's Im Boot along with works by Johannes Molzahn and Kurt Schwitters were reproduced in the Exhibition of Degenerate Art catalogue. A sentence on the top of the page reads "Selbst das wurde einmal ernst genommen und hoch bezahlt!"

The Entartete-Kunst catalogue dedicated two pages to Room 5, the largest room of the exhibition, with works exhibited by the so-called Group 9, of which Metzinger's work entitled Am Strand (At the Beach) figures. A text accompanying the works singles out Molzahn, Metzinger and Schwitters, summarizing the essence of the entire exhibition:

The current location of En Canot is unknown and it may have been destroyed by the Germans. After the exhibit, paintings were sorted out for sale and sold in Switzerland at auction. Some works were acquired by museums, others by private collectors. Nazi officers took many for their private use: for example, Hermann Göring took fourteen valuable pieces, including works by Vincent van Gogh and Paul Cézanne. In March, 1939, the Berlin Fire Brigade burned approximately 4000 works which had less value on the international market.

En Canot is listed on the Lost Art Internet Database with the title "Im Boot", inventory number: Museum A II 698; EK 16056. It is also listed in the Degenerate Art Database, with the titles "Im Boot" and "Im Kanu", inventory number 16056. This Internet database documents more than 21,000 artworks condemned as "degenerate" by the Nazis and seized from German museums in 1937.

A preparatory drawing (study for Le Canot, Musée National d'Art Moderne, Centre Georges Pompidou, Paris) was published in Les Soirées de Paris, no. 19, 1913. Les Soirées de Paris is the title of a literature and art review magazine. They were published in two series: the first series from February 1912 to June 1913 (No. 1 - No. 17); the second in November 1913 to July–August 1914 (No. 18 - No. 27). The magazine was founded by Serge Férat, Guillaume Apollinaire and André Salmon, et al. It was in part to facilitate the return of Apollinaire to the literary scene after having been suspected in the theft of the Mona Lisa (September 1911).

Another drawing of the same subject, now in the Musée d'Art Moderne de la Ville de Paris, is signed and inscribed by Metzinger; Dessin pour "En Canot", leading to the belief that the correct title for the present work is En Canot.

Provenance

 Acquired in 1916 by Georg Muche at the Galerie Der Sturm
 1930 - Berlin, Nationalgalerie (Kronprinzen-Palais), 1929 Kauf durch den Minister auf der Ausstellung "10 Jahre Novembergruppe" aus einer von Georg Muche angebotenen Sammlung; 1930 Überweisung an die Nationalgalerie
 Acquired by the Nationalgalerie, Berlin, in 1936 (on deposit by the Ministerium für Wissenschaft, Kunst und Volksbildung), Room 5, NS inventory no. 16056. Titled Im Kanu (In the canoe).
 07.07.1937 - xx: Deutsches Reich / Reichsministerium für Volksaufklärung und Propaganda, Berlin, Beschlagnahme
 1938 - xx: Velten/Mark, Depot für Propagandaausstellungen, Lagerung der Exponate für die Wanderausstellung "Entartete Kunst"

Exhibitions

 Salon d'Automne, Paris, 15 November 1913 – 8 January 1914
 Moderni Umeni, S.V.U. Mánes, Prague, February–March 1914
 Galerie Der Sturm, July 1914, Berlin
 Kronprinzenpalais, National Gallery, Berlin, 1930, where it had been since 1927
 Entartete Kunst (2.1), München, Hofgarten-Arkaden, 19.07.1937 - 30.11.1937
 Entartete Kunst (2.2), Berlin, Haus der Kunst, 26.02.1938 - 08.05.1938
 Entartete Kunst (2.3), Leipzig, Grassi-Museum, 13.05.1938 - 06.06.1938
 Entartete Kunst (2.4), Düsseldorf, Kunstpalast, 18.06.1938 - 07.08.1938
 Entartete Kunst (2.5), Salzburg, Festspielhaus, 04.09.1938 - 02.10.1938
 Entartete Kunst (2.6), Hamburg, Schulausstellungsgebäude, 11.11.1938 - 30.12.1938

Literature

 Zlatá Praha, 13 March 1914, magazine article for the occasion of the Moderni Umeni, S.V.U. Mánes exhibition in Prague (reproduced).
 Albert Gleizes, The Epic, From immobile form to mobile form, 1913–1914, First published in German, entitled Kubismus, 1928. The French version, L'Epopée (The Epic), was published in the journal Le Rouge et le Noir, 1929. The first version was written in response to an invitation from the Bauhaus in 1925. Translation by Peter Brooke.
 Reich Propaganda Directorate, Culture Office, Degenerate Art Exhibition guide, 1938.
 Roh, Franz, "Entartete" Kunst. Kunstbarbarei im Dritten Reich, Hannover 1962. S. 136.
 Steven Spielberg Film and Video Archive, German town; Degenerate Art exhibit in Munich, Story RG-60.2668, Tape 951. Film in which Metzinger's work appears next to Handstand by Willi Baumeister at the Degenerate Art exhibition, minute 16:33 - 16:39.
 Roters, Eberhard, (Hrsg.), Stationen der Moderne. Kataloge epochaler Kunstausstellungen in Deutschland 1910–1962. Kommentarband zu den Nachdrucken der zehn Ausstellungskataloge. Kommentarband, 1988, S. 163.
 Moser, Joann, with an essay by Daniel Robbins,  Jean Metzinger in Retrospect, The University of Iowa Museum of Art, J. Paul Getty Trust, University of Washington Press), 1985 p. 60.
 Degenerate Art. The Fate of the Avant-Garde in Nazi Germany, Ausst.-Kat. Los Angeles County Museum of Art, LACMA, 1991, hrsg. von Stephanie Barron, 1991. S. 61, 300.61, 300.
 Janda, Annegret und Grabowski, Jörn, Kunst in Deutschland 1905–1937. Die verlorene Sammlung der Nationalgalerie, Berlin 1992. S. 161f. Abb. S. S. 161, Kat. Nr. 317.
 Steinfeld, Ludwig, Felix Ramholz: Der Sonntagsmaler Felix Muche-Ramholz, Ernst Wasmuth Verlag Tübingen/Berlin 1993.
 Zuschlag, Christoph, "Entartete Kunst". Ausstellungsstrategien im Nazi-Deutschland, Worms 1995. S. 195, 239, 268, 273.
 Engelhardt, Katrin, Die Ausstellung "Entartete Kunst" in Berlin. Rekonstruktion und Analyse, in: Uwe Fleckner (Hrsg.), Angriff auf die Avantgarde. Kunst und Kunstpolitik im Nationalsozialismus, Berlin 2007, S. 89-188. S. 177.

References

External links

 Jean Metzinger Catalogue Raisonné entry page for En Canot
 LACMA, Metzinger's Im Kanu, next to Willi Baumeister, Handstand, at the Degenerate Art exhibition, 1937
 LACMA, Info Room 5 Degenerate art exhibition, Metzinger's Im Kanu is number 16056
 Youtube, En Canot shown in a film/video at minute 3:10 - 3:15, hanging at the 1937 Munich Exhibition of Degenerate Art
 Metzinger's Im Boot reproduced in Ludwig Steinfeld, Felix Ramholz: Der Sonntagsmaler Felix Muche-Ramholz, Ernst Wasmuth Verlag Tübingen/Berlin 1993
 Metzinger's Im Boot reproduced along with works by other artists in Ludwig Steinfeld, Felix Ramholz: Der Sonntagsmaler Felix Muche-Ramholz, Ernst Wasmuth Verlag Tübingen/Berlin 1993
 "Degenerate Art: The Attack on Modern Art in Nazi Germany, 1937", Jean Metzinger "Im Boot" (minute 1:45), Neue Galerie in New York (video)
 Jean Metzinger, 1913, Dessin pour "En canot" (former title: La femme au canot et à l'ombrelle), Musée d’Art Moderne de la Ville de Paris

Paintings by Jean Metzinger
1913 paintings
Lost paintings
Painting controversies
Ships in art
Stolen works of art
Nazi-looted art